Sheer Hellish Miasma is a 2002 noise album by Kevin Drumm.

Reception
Pitchfork Media gave Sheer Hellish Miasma a glowing review and named it the 39th best album of 2002.

Track listing

References

External links
Dusted Reviews

2002 albums
Kevin Drumm albums